Kim Kyun-woo (born April 8, 1983), known professionally as Jay, is a South Korean singer and actor. He is a member of EDM trio TraxX and a former member of SM Entertainment's project group SM The Ballad.

Career
In 2002, Jay (Typhoon) along with Minwoo (Rose), Jungwoo (Attack), Sungmin, Junsu and Eunhyuk made their first television appearance in a show called Heejun vs. Kangta, Battle of the Century: Pop vs. Rock. Moon Hee-jun taught Typhoon, Rose and Attack on to sing rock while Sungmin, Junsu, and Eunhyuk were taught other singing techniques by Kangta. The six trainees separated a year later, then Typhoon, Rose, and Attack debuted as members of rock band TraxX. The trio separated when Junsu went on to debut as a member of TVXQ. Then Sungmin and Eunhyuk joined ten other trainees and formed Super Junior 05, the first generation of rotational boy band Super Junior.

Jay made official debut with TRAX on July 20, 2004 with the single Paradox.

In February 2009, Jay began his acting career with cast in supporting roles in MBC's Romance Zero.

In 2010, he participated in musicals Brothers Were Brave, Rock of Ages and rotated as D'Artagnan with Super Junior's Kyhuhyun in The Three Musketeers. He also cast in KBS's  President alongside Super Junior's Sungmin, with plays the role of Sungmin's half-brother.

In May 2011, Jay landed his first leading role in KBS's drama My Bittersweet Life, playing the character Lee Se-in.

In May 2014, Jay was confirmed to cast in the musical Singin' In The Rain as Don Lockwood with Super Junior's Kyuhyun and EXO's Baekhyun. The musical ran from June 5, 2014 until August 3, 2014 at the Chungmu Art Hall in Seoul.

In September 2016, Jay was cast in supporting roles in KBS's drama On the Way to the Airport, playing the character Jang Hyun-woo.

In September 2017, Jay was cast in supporting roles in KBS1's Andante, playing the character Kang Hyun-woo.

Personal life
Jay enlisted for a 2-year mandatory military service on 26 March 2012. He received four weeks of basic military training in Busan and then continued to serve as a public service worker. He was discharged in 2014.

Discography

Filmography

Television series

Television shows

Theater

References

External links 

 

1983 births
Living people
American expatriates in South Korea
American musicians of Korean descent
Japanese-language singers of South Korea
Singers from California
South Korean male idols
South Korean rhythm and blues singers
South Korean rock singers
South Korean male musical theatre actors
South Korean male television actors
21st-century South Korean male singers